Francis James "Frank" Clement (born 26 April 1952 in Glasgow) is a retired Scottish athlete who competed in the 1500 metres. He was a member of Bellahouston Harriers and a graduate of Strathclyde University.

Clement was an Olympic 1500 m finalist coming fifth at the 1976 Games in Montreal in a time of 3:39.65. He was also fourth in the 1978 Commonwealth Games in Edmonton.

In 1973 Clement achieved success in the European Cup final which he won in a time of 3:40.8, defeating future Olympic bronze medalist Paul-Heinz Wellmann and 1974 European champion Klaus-Peter Justus. He also won the 1973 World Student Games (Universiade) 1500m in a time of 3:42.32 defeating the top American runner Tony Waldrop. Clement was a UK 1,500 metres and mile record holder in the 1970s and won the Emsley Carr Mile in 1973 and again in 1974. Clement also won the AAA 1,500 metres title in 1972.

Clement improved the British record for 1,500 metres in 1974 to 3:37.4. He set British mile records of 3:54.95 in 1975 and 3:54.2 in 1978. Clement recorded his fastest time for 1,500 of 3:35.66 in 1978. His other personal bests included: 800 metres – 1:45.76; 1,000 metres - 2:19.81 (1975); 2,000 metres - 5:02.8 (1978).

After retiring from competitive athletics, Clement worked for 26 years for Glasgow City Council, where he was race director of the Glasgow Women's 10,000m.

References

 Nelson, Cordner and Quercentani, Roberto  (1985): The Milers 
 Phillips, Bob (2000): A History of Athletics at the Commonwealth Games
 Watman, Mel (1981): Encyclopedia of Track and Field Athletics 
 Personal Bests
 British All-Time Lists:800 - 2,000 metres

1952 births
Living people
Sportspeople from Glasgow
Scottish male middle-distance runners
Olympic athletes of Great Britain
Athletes (track and field) at the 1976 Summer Olympics
Commonwealth Games competitors for Scotland
Athletes (track and field) at the 1978 Commonwealth Games
Universiade medalists in athletics (track and field)
Universiade gold medalists for Great Britain
Medalists at the 1973 Summer Universiade